Himanshi Choudhry is a British actress. She is known for playing Sheetal Dhanrajgir in Tu Aashiqui and Sudha Dhawan in Inside Edge.

Early life and Career
Choudhary was born in Manchester to Indian parents and grew up in New Delhi, India. She made her film debut in the 2008 movie Antardwand, which won the National Film Award for Best Film on Other Social Issues.

Filmography

Film

Television

Web series

References

External links

Living people
Actresses from Manchester
British film actresses
British television actresses
British soap opera actresses
British web series actresses
Actresses in Hindi cinema
Actresses in Hindi television
British people of Indian descent
British actresses of Indian descent
British expatriate actresses in India
European actresses in India
21st-century British actresses
Year of birth missing (living people)